Heikki Albert Sammallahti (January 20, 1886 – October 17, 1954) was a Finnish gymnast who competed in the 1912 Summer Olympics. He was part of the Finnish team, which won the silver medal in the gymnastics men's team, free system event.

References

External links
profile

1886 births
1954 deaths
Finnish male artistic gymnasts
Gymnasts at the 1912 Summer Olympics
Olympic gymnasts of Finland
Olympic silver medalists for Finland
Olympic medalists in gymnastics
Medalists at the 1912 Summer Olympics
20th-century Finnish people